Brushite is a phosphate mineral with the chemical formula .  Crystals of the pure compound belong to the monoclinic space group C2/c and are colorless. It is the phosphate analogue of the arsenate pharmacolite.

Discovery and occurrence
Brushite was first described in 1865 for an occurrence on Aves Island, Nueva Esparta, Venezuela, and named for the American mineralogist George Jarvis Brush (1831–1912). It is believed to be a precursor of apatite and is found in guano-rich caves, formed by the interaction of guano with calcite and clay at a low pH. It occurs in phosphorite deposits and forms encrustations on old bones. It may result from runoff of fields which have received heavy fertilizer applications. Associated minerals include tanarakite, ardealite, hydroxylapatite, variscite and gypsum.

Brushite is the original precipitating material in calcium phosphate kidney stones. It is also one of the minerals present in dental calculi.

References

Calcium minerals
Phosphate minerals
Cave minerals
Monoclinic minerals
Minerals in space group 9